Marianne Irniger (born 26 October 1966) is a Swiss cross-country skier. She competed in three events at the 1988 Winter Olympics.

Cross-country skiing results
All results are sourced from the International Ski Federation (FIS).

Olympic Games

World Championships

World Cup

Season standings

References

External links
 

1966 births
Living people
Swiss female cross-country skiers
Olympic cross-country skiers of Switzerland
Cross-country skiers at the 1988 Winter Olympics
Place of birth missing (living people)
20th-century Swiss women